Life of Defiance is the third and final studio album from Call to Preserve. Facedown Records released the album on June 8, 2010.

Critical reception

Awarding the album four stars from HM Magazine, Rob Shameless states, "Call to Preserve puts out better records with each release, and Life of Defiance is no exception." Peter John Willoughby, rating the album an eight out of ten for Cross Rhythms, writes, "The only drawback is the relatively short length (less than 31 minutes) of this classic hardcore punk album." Giving the album two and a half stars at Jesus Freak Hideout, Wayne Reimer describes, "it lacks in a lot of areas, particularly creativity." Steve, awarding the album four stars by Indie Vision Music, says, "Call to Preserver has managed to craft good hardcore across an entire album rather than just a few songs on the album."

Track listing

References

2010 albums
Facedown Records albums